Major Dinesh Raghu Raman, AC was an Indian military officer with the 19th Battalion of the Jat Regiment who was posthumously awarded India's highest peacetime military decoration Ashoka Chakra.

Early life 
Major Dinesh Raghu Raman was born on 6 April 1978. His father was Honorary Captain SK Murthy and his mother was Mala. He completed his schooling from Kendriya Vidyalaya, INA Colony, New Delhi. He joined the prestigious National Defence Academy in 1996.

Military career
He was commissioned to the 19 battalion of Jat Regiment as a lieutenant on 11 December 1999. Among his batchmates was fellow Ashoka Chakra recipient Mohit Sharma. He was promoted captain on 11 December 2003 and to major on 11 December 2005. In his short military career, he served in various appointments and was highly appreciated by his seniors for his leadership and dedication qualities. He was also awarded the Chief of Army Staff Commendation medal for his contribution in Operation Parakram in Drass sector.

On 2 October 2007, he led an operation against terrorists in the Baramulla sector of Jammu and Kashmir. He heard the shouts of a fellow officer during the fire exchange and crawled towards him and two others amid the intense fire. Thereafter he killed two terrorists but sustained gunshot wounds in the process. He continued to lead his team forward until he fell unconscious. He was later airlifted to the Srinagar base hospital. For his bravery, he was posthumously awarded the Ashoka Chakra, the highest peacetime military decoration in India.

Baramulla Operation 
Maj Raman was delegated to serve with the 34 Rashtriya Rifles Battalion in the Jammu and kashmir area in 2006 following service with his unit for a few years. Maj Raman led the highly successful “Op Narawar” operation in June 2007, which resulted in the elimination of three hardened terrorists in his area of command.

Maj Raman was tasked on October 2, 2007, with initiating an operation in a Baramulla area to ferret out militants hidden there. Maj Raman's crew was dispatched to the suspected region around 0820 hours on that day. Major Raman witnessed screams of a fellow officer who had been gravely hurt during the continuous altercation at 0855 hours, while closing in on suspected residences.

Maj Raman assessed the situation swiftly and rushed in the direction of his colleague's rescue. He moved towards the injured officer amid intense enemy fire, showing the highest level of camaraderie and esprit-de-corps. He then rescued him and two other wounded soldiers and transported them to a safer location. He then proceeded on to the two militants who had inflicted so many losses among the troops, and shot both of them dead in a vicious close combat battle. Other terrorists, meanwhile, were hiding in a nearby home and fired at Major Raman. This opened up a new front in the gunfight, and Maj Raman was critically injured in the ongoing exchange of fire.

For his remarkable courage, camaraderie, fighting spirit, and tremendous sacrifice, Major Dinesh Raghu Raman was awarded the nation's highest peacetime gallantry honour, the "Ashok Chakra."

Ashoka Chakra
The President of India noted in the Ashoka Chakra citation that Major Raman displayed most conspicuous bravery besides camaraderie and leadership of the highest order and made the supreme sacrifice for the nation.

The following is the Ashoka Chakra citation honouring Major Dinesh Raghu Raman's supreme sacrifice:

References

Recipients of the Ashoka Chakra (military decoration)
Date of death missing
Place of birth missing
Ashoka Chakra
1978 births